Yarbrough is an unincorporated community in Quitman County, Mississippi. Yarbrough is located on Mississippi Highway 3 south of Lambert.

References

Unincorporated communities in Quitman County, Mississippi
Unincorporated communities in Mississippi